The karate competitions at the 2017 Southeast Asian Games in Kuala Lumpur were held at Kuala Lumpur Convention Centre.

The 2017 Games feature competitions in 16 events (4 kata and 12 kumite).

Medalists

Kata

Kumite

Men

Women

Medal standings

References

External links
  

2017
2017 Southeast Asian Games events
Southeast Asian Games